Walter Horacio Peralta Saracho (born 3 June 1982) is a Uruguayan football striker currently playing for Deportivo Maldonado in Uruguay.

Career
After beginning his professional football career with local side Danubio F.C., Peralta has had a journeyman's career, having appeared for 17 clubs in Uruguay and abroad by the time he signed with Club Sportivo Cerrito in 2015.

Honours
Nacional
Uruguayan League - 2002

Flamengo
Brazil Cup - 2006

References

External links

1982 births
Living people
Footballers from Montevideo
Uruguayan footballers
Uruguayan expatriate footballers
Uruguay international footballers
Danubio F.C. players
Club Nacional de Football players
C.A. Cerro players
C.A. Bella Vista players
Albacete Balompié players
Cagliari Calcio players
Grasshopper Club Zürich players
CR Flamengo footballers
Associação Académica de Coimbra – O.A.F. players
Quilmes Atlético Club footballers
Club Puebla players
Atlante F.C. footballers
Patriotas Boyacá footballers
Uruguayan Primera División players
La Liga players
Liga MX players
Primeira Liga players
Serie A players
Categoría Primera A players
Expatriate footballers in Italy
Expatriate footballers in Spain
Expatriate footballers in Mexico
Expatriate footballers in Brazil
Expatriate footballers in Colombia
Expatriate footballers in Portugal
Expatriate footballers in Switzerland
Uruguayan expatriate sportspeople in Italy
Uruguayan expatriate sportspeople in Spain
Uruguayan expatriate sportspeople in Mexico
Uruguayan expatriate sportspeople in Brazil
Uruguayan expatriate sportspeople in Colombia
Uruguayan expatriate sportspeople in Portugal
Uruguayan expatriate sportspeople in Switzerland
Association football forwards